Piman (or Tepiman) refers to a group of languages within the Uto-Aztecan family that are spoken by ethnic groups (including the Pima) spanning from Arizona in the north to Durango, Mexico in the south.

The Piman languages are as follows (Campbell 1997):

 1. O'odham (also known as Pima language, Papago language)
 2. O'ob (also known as Mountain Pima, Lowland Pima)
 3. O'otham (also known as Tepehuán proper, Southwestern Tepehuán, Southeastern Tepehuán)
 4. Tepecano (†)

Morphology
Piman languages are agglutinative, where words use suffix complexes for a variety of purposes with several morphemes strung together.

Sources

 
Agglutinative languages
Languages of the United States
Indigenous languages of the Southwestern United States
Indigenous languages of the North American Southwest